André Savard (27 May 1911, Verdun – 25 February 1997) was a French politician. He represented the French Communist Party in the National Assembly from 1946 to 1951 and from 1956 to 1958.

References

1911 births
1997 deaths
People from Verdun
Politicians from Grand Est
French Communist Party politicians
Deputies of the 1st National Assembly of the French Fourth Republic
Deputies of the 3rd National Assembly of the French Fourth Republic